Prince Edward Island Route 6 is a secondary highway in central Prince Edward Island.

Route 6 begins in Kensington at the junction of Routes 2 and 20, bearing east. It passes the community of New London before turning at a roundabout in Stanley Bridge. It is the main road through Cavendish, meeting Route 13 in the town, then turning south towards North Rustico. It meets Route 7 at Oyster Bed Bridge, turning east once again. It turns south once again near Grand Tracadie before terminating at Route 2 at Bedford Corner, near Dunstaffnage.

Major intersections

References 

006
006
006